The Order of the National Hero is the highest honour awarded by the government of Belize. The Order of the National Hero is given for "extraordinary and outstanding achievement and merit in service to Belize or to humanity at large." Unlike the lower Order of Belize which can be awarded to foreign dignitaries, only Belizean citizens are eligible for the Order of the National Hero.

The order was instituted on 16 August 1991.  the Order of the National Hero has been awarded three times, twice posthumously.

Recipients

George Cadle Price, 2000
Philip Goldson (posthumous), 2008
Monrad Metzgen (posthumous)

References

Orders, decorations, and medals of Belize

Awards established in 1991
1991 establishments in Belize
Hero (title)